Frederick Sutton (1836 – 26 January 1906) was a 19th-century Member of Parliament from the Hawke's Bay Region of New Zealand and an early settler, storekeeper and farmer in the area.

He represented the Napier electorate from an 1877 by-election to 1881, and then the Hawkes Bay electorate from 1881 to 1884, when he was defeated.

He died in Napier on 26 January 1906 aged 69 years, leaving a widow, one son and five or six daughters.

References

1836 births
1906 deaths
Members of the New Zealand House of Representatives
Unsuccessful candidates in the 1887 New Zealand general election
Unsuccessful candidates in the 1884 New Zealand general election
New Zealand MPs for North Island electorates
19th-century New Zealand politicians